The pulmonary plexus is an autonomic plexus formed from pulmonary branches of vagus nerve and the sympathetic trunk. The plexus is in continuity with the deep cardiac plexus.

Structure
It innervates the bronchial tree and the visceral pleura. According to the relation of nerves to the root of the lung, the pulmonary plexus is divided into the anterior pulmonary plexus, which lies in front of the lung and the posterior pulmonary plexus, which lies behind the lung. The anterior pulmonary plexus is close in proximity to the pulmonary artery. The posterior pulmonary plexus is bounded by the superior edge of the pulmonary artery and the lower edge of the pulmonary vein. Both lungs are innervated primarily by the posterior pulmonary plexus; it accounts for 74–77% of the total innervation.

References

External links

Nerves of the torso
Vagus nerve
Nerve plexus